The American Institute of Physics (AIP) instituted their Science Writing Award to "promote effective science communication in print and broadcast media in order to improve the general public's appreciation of physics, astronomy, and allied science fields." The winner receives $3000, and an engraved Windsor chair.  The award is given in three broad categories: 1) science writing, 2) work intended for children, and 3) work done in new media. The AIP stopped issuing awards to three categories: 1) work by a professional journalist (last awarded in 2011) 2) work by a scientist (last awarded in 2009), and 3) broadcast media (last awarded in 2009)

Winners of this Science Writing Award include Nobel Prize winners Charles Townes, Steven Weinberg, and Kip Thorne; other notable winners include Simon Singh, Neil DeGrasse Tyson, Lawrence Krauss, John Wheeler, Leonard Susskind, Clifford Martin Will, Abraham Pais, Heinz Pagels, Banesh Hoffmann, and Martin Gardner. Marcia Bartusiak has won the award three times, twice for her books (in 2019 and 2001) and once for her journalism (in 1982).

Winners: New Media
2012: - Anna Rothschild for Nova, "The Amazing Atomic Clock"

Past Winners: Books
2020: Susan Hockfield for The Age of Living Machines (W.W. Norton & Company).
2019: Marcia Bartusiak for Dispatches from Planet 3 (Yale University Press).
2019: David Hu for How to Walk on Water and Climb Up Walls (Yale University Press).
2018: David Baron for American Eclipse: A Nation's Epic Race to Catch the Shadow of the Moon and Win the Glory of the World (Liveright Publishing Corporation/W. W. Norton & Company).
2017: Timothy Jorgensen for Strange Glow: The Story of Radiation (Princeton University Press).
2016: Chris Woodford for Atoms Under the Floorboards: The Surprising Science Hidden in Your Home (Bloomsbury).
2015: Charles Adler for Wizards, Aliens, and Starships: Physics and Math in Fantasy and Science Fiction (Princeton University Press).
2014: Lee Billings for Five Billion Years of Solitude: the Search for Life Among the Stars (Current/Penguin).

Past Winners: Journalist
2011: George Musser for Scientific American magazine,"Could Time End?"
2010: Tom Zoellner for Penguin Group, "Uranium: War, Energy, and the Rock that Shaped the World"
2008: Ann Finkbeiner for Viking/Penguin,"The Jasons"
2007: Tim Folger, Discover Magazine,"If an Electron can be in Two Places at Once, Why Can't You?"
2006: Barbara Goldsmith for WW Norton and Atlas Books, "Obsessive Genius"
2005: Michael Moyer for Popular Science, "Journey to the 10th Dimension"
2004: J. Madeleine Nash for Warner Books, El Niño: Unlocking the Secrets of the Master Weather-Maker
2003: Diane Tennant for The Virginian-Pilot,"A Cosmic Tale"
2002: No award given
2001: Marcia Bartusiak for Joseph Henry Press, Einstein's Unfinished Symphony
2000: Ron Cowen for USA Today, "Quantum Leap in Research Draws Cosmic Insight Closer"; Science News "Travelin' Light"; The Washington Post "Now Hear This!"
1999: Michael Lemonick, Other Worlds: The Search for Life in the Universe, Simon & Schuster
1998: Robyn Suriano and Todd Halvorson for Florida Today, "Cassini: Debating the Risks"
1997: Hazel Muir for New Scientist Magazine "Watch Out, Here Comes the Sun" and "A Fast Rain's Going to Fall"
1996: K.C. Cole for The Los Angeles Times,(3 newspaper articles)
1995: Gary Taubes for Discover Magazine, "Welcome to Femtoland"
1994: Dick Teresi for Omni Magazine, "The Last Great Experiment of the 20th Century"
1993: Billy Goodman for Air & Space Magazine, "The Planet Hunters"
1992: Dennis Overbye for Harper Collins Publishers, Lonely Hearts of the Cosmos
1991: Charles Petit for Mosaic Magazine, "Vanishingly Close to Absolute Zero"
1990: Jerry E. Bishop for The Wall Street Journal, "Cold Fusion"
1989: Timothy Ferris for William & Morrow Inc, Coming of Age in the Milky Way
1988: Richard Preston for The Atlantic Monthly Press, First Light
1987: Shannon Brownlee and Allan Chen for Discover Magazine, "Waiting for the Big One"
1986: Arthur Fisher for Mosaic, "Chaos: The Ultimate Asymmetry"
1985: Ben Patrusky for World Book Yearbook, "The Wandering Continents"
1984: John Tierney for Discover Magazine,"Perpetual Commotion"
1983: Martin Gardner for Discover Magazine, "Quantum Weirdness"
1982: Marcia Bartusiak for Discover Magazine, "The Ultimate Timepiece"
1981: Leo Janus for Science 80 Magazine,"Timekeepers of the Solar System"
1980: Dennis Overbye for Omni Magazine, "The Wizard of Time and Space"
1979: Robert C. Cowen for The Christian Science Monitor, "The New Astronomy"
1978: Timothy Ferris for The Red Limit: The Search for the Edge of the Universe
1977: William D. Metz for Science Magazine, "Fusion Research"
1976: Frederic Golden for Time Magazine, "Forecast: Earthquake"
1975: Tom Alexander for Fortune Magazine, "Ominous Changes in the World's Weather"
1974: Patrick Young for The National Observer, "A Quake Is Due at..."
1973: Edward Edelson for The New York News, "The Mystery of Space"
1972: Jerry E. Bishop for The Wall Street Journal, "Celestial Clue"
1971: Kenneth Weaver for National Geographic, "Voyage to the Planets"
1970: C.P. Gilmore for Popular Science, "Can We Stop Earthquakes from Happening"
1969: Walter S. Sullivan for The New York Times, "Flight of Apollo 8"
1968: William J. Perkinson for The Baltimore Sun, "ABM Primer: Physics for Defense"

Past Winners: Scientist
2011: Dan Falk
Scientific magazine
Could Time End?

2009 - Dan Falk
COSMOS magazine
End of Days: A Universe in Ruins

2008 - Gino Segre
Viking/Penguin
Faust in Copenhagen

2007 - James Trefil
Astronomy magazine
Where is the Universe Heading?

2006: Simon Singh
Harper Collins
Big Bang

2005: Neil DeGrasse Tyson
Natural History Magazine
In the Beginning

2004: Len Fisher
Arcade Publishing, Inc.
How to Dunk a Doughnut: The Science of Everyday Life
www.lenfisher.co.uk

2003: Ray Jayawardhana
Astronomy Magazine
Beyond Black

2002: Lawrence Krauss
Little, Brown & Co
Atom: An Odyssey from the Big Bang to Life on Earth...and Beyond

Honorable Mention: Ken Croswell
The Free Press
The Universe at Midnight

2001: Neil de Grasse Tyson, Charles Liu, and Robert Irion
Joseph Henry Press
One Universe

2000: Charles H. Townes
Oxford University Press
How the Laser Happened

1999: John Wheeler and Kenneth Ford, 
W.W. Norton, 
Geons, Black Holes & Quantum Foam

1998: Leonard Susskind, 
Scientific American, 
Black Holes and the Information Paradox

1997: Award postponed until 1998

1996: Mitchell Begelman & Martin Rees
W.H. Freeman & Co. 
Gravity's Fatal Attraction: Black Holes in the Universe

1995: Eric Chaisson
HarperCollins Publishing
The Hubble Wars

1994: Kip S. Thorne
W.W. Norton & Company
Black Holes and Time Warps: Einstein's Outrageous Legacy

1993: Hans C. von Baeyer
Random House
Taming the Atom

1992: David C. Cassidy
W.H. Freeman & Co.
Uncertainty: The Life and Science of Werner Heisenberg

1991: Harold Lewis
W.W. Norton & Co.
Technological Risk

1990: Bruce Murray
W.W. Norton & Co.
Journey Into Space

1989: Mark Littmann
John Wiley & Sons
Planets Beyond: Discovering the Outer Solar System

1988: Michael Riordan
Simon & Schuster
The Hunting of the Quark

1987: Clifford Martin Will
Basic Books
Was Einstein Right?

1986: Donald Goldsmith
Walker and Company
Nemesis: The Death Star

1985: Edwin C. Krupp
Macmillan Publishing Company
The Comet and You

1984: George Greenstein
Freundlich Books
Frozen Star

1983: Abraham Pais
Oxford University Press
Subtle is the Lord...The Science and the Life of Albert Einstein

1982: Heinz Pagels
Simon & Schuster
The Cosmic Code: Quantum Physics as the Language of Nature

1981: Eric Chaisson
Little, Brown & Company
Cosmic Dawn

1980: , 
W.H. Freeman & Company
Black Holes and Warped Spacetime

1979: Hans C. von Baeyer
Alumni Gazette, College of William & Mary
The Wonder of Gravity

1978: Edwin C. Krupp
Doubleday & Company
In Search of Ancient Astronomies

1977: Steven Weinberg
Basic Books, Inc.
The First Three Minutes

1976: Jeremy Bernstein
The New Yorker
Physicist: I.I. Rabi

1975: Robert H. March
Science Year
The Quandary Over Quarks

1974: Robert D. Chapman
NASA/Goddard Space Flight Center
'Comet Kohoutek1973: Banesh Hoffmann
Viking PressAlbert Einstein: Creator and Rebel1972: Dietrich Schroeer
Addison-WesleyPhysics & Its Fifth Dimension: Society1971: Robert H. March
MacGraw-Hill Book Co., Inc.Physics for Poets1970: Jeremy Bernstein
(written for) Atomic Energy CommissionThe Elusive Neutrino1969: Kip S. Thorne
Science YearThe Death of a StarPast Winners: Children's

2011: Vicki Wittenstein
Boyds Mills Press
"Planet Hunter: Geoff Marcy and the Search for Other Earths"

2010: Gillian Richardson
Annick Press Ltd.
"Kaboom! Explosions of All Kinds"

2009: Cora Lee and Gillian O'Reilly
Annick Press
"The Great Number Rumble: A story of Math in Surprising Places"

2008: Alexandra Siy and Dennis Kunkel
Charlesbridge
"SNEEZE!

2007: Jacob Berkowitz
Kids Can Press
"Jurassic Poop"

2006: David Garrison, Shannon Hunt and Jude Isabella
Kids Can Press
"Fantastic Feats and Failures"

2005: Bea Uusma Schyffert
Chronicle Books
"The Man Who Went to the Far Side of the Moon"

2004: Marianne Dyson
National Geographic
"Home on the Moon: Living in the Space Frontier"

2003: Ron Miller
Twenty-First Century Books, a Division of The Millbrook Press
Worlds Beyond Series: Extrasolar Planets, The Sun, Jupiter, and Venus

2002: Fred Bortz
The Millbrook Press
Techno-Matter: The Materials Behind the Marvels

2001: Cynthia Pratt Nicolson
Kids Can Press
Exploring Space

2000: Jill Frankel Hauser
Williamson Publishing
Science Play!
Gizmos & Gadgets

1999: Elaine Scott
Hyperion Books for Children
Close Encounters

1998: Barbara Taylor
Henry Holt and Company
Earth Explained

1997: Donald Silver
Silver Burdett Press
Extinction is Forever

1996: Steve Tomecek
W.H. Freeman and Company
Bouncing & Bending Light

1995: Sally Ride and Tam O'Shaughnessy
Crown Publishers, Inc.
The Third Planet: Exploring the Earth from Space

1994: Wendy Baker, Andrew Haslam, and Alexandra Parsons
Macmillan
Make it Work!

1993: Gail Gibbons
Holiday House
Stargazers

1992: Gloria Skurzynski
Bradbury Press
Almost The Real Thing

1991: Richard Maurer
Simon & Schuster Inc.
Airborne

1990: David Macaulay
Houghton Mifflin Company
The Way Things Work

1989: Gail Kay Haines
Putnam & Grosset
Micromysteries

1988: Susan Kovacs Buxbaum, Rita Golden Graham, and Maryann Cocca-Leffler
Basic Books
Splash! All About Baths

Past Winner: Broadcast Media
2009: Tom Shachtman and David Dugan
Windfall Films in collaboration with Meridian Productions and broadcast on WGBH/NOVA in association with TPT/Twin Cities Public Television
"Absolute Zero"

2008: Julia Cort
WGBH/NOVA scienceNOW
"Asteroid"

2007: Jim Handman, Pat Senson, and Bob McDonald
CBC Radio
"Multiple Worlds, Parallel Universes"

2006: David Kestenbaum
National Public Radio
"Einstein's Miraculous Year: How Smart was Einstein?"

2005: Jon Palfreman
WNET New York
"Innovation: Light Speed"

2004: William S. Hammack
"Public Radio Pieces" WILL-AM Radio
2003: Jim Handman, Pat Senson, and Bob McDonald
CBC Radio
"It's About Time"

2002: David Kestenbaum
National Public Radio
"Measuring Muons" (RealMedia file)

2001: Jon Palfreman
WGBH- Frontline''/NOVA
"What's Up with the Weather?"

2000: Craig Heaps
KTVU- TV
Time & Space
Space Weather

1999: Dan Falk
CBC Radio
From Empedocles to Einstein

1998: Sandy Rathbun and Dave Greenleaf
KVOA-TV
Asteroid: The Real Story

References

External links 
 Science Communication Awards at AIP

Science communication awards
Science writing awards
Awards of the American Institute of Physics